Anand Sharma (born 5 January 1953) is an Indian politician and former Union Cabinet Minister in charge of Commerce and Industry and Textiles in the Government of India. Since June 2014, Sharma was the Deputy Leader of opposition in Rajya Sabha, the upper house of the Indian Parliament till 2022.

Early life and education 
Anand Sharma is the son of P. A. Sharma and Prabha Rani Sharma and was born in Shimla, Himachal Pradesh. He was educated at R.P.C.S.D.B. College (now R.K.M.V. College), Shimla and Faculty of Law, Himachal Pradesh University, Shimla.

Career 
Sharma was a prominent leader in the student and youth movement in India, a founder member of the Congress Party's students wing the NSUI. He was also a former President of the Indian Youth Congress. Sharma asserts that the country needed investment in the manufacturing sector and the cost of credit must be brought down for this purpose. In February 2012, Sharma led a business delegation of more than 120 people to Pakistan for improving trade ties. During this visit, he discussed the revision of the existing visa bilateral agreement, signed in 1974, with his Pakistani counterpart Makhdoom Muhammad Ameen Faheem, to facilitate travel by bona fide businessmen from both the countries.

As India's commerce and Industry Minister, he had taken major policy initiatives to accelerate Manufacturing and attract Foreign investments in India. Anand Sharma, was instrumental in making of India's first National Manufacturing policy (NMP) in 2011, with the objective to raise the share of manufacturing from 16 to 25 percent of GDP and creation of 100 million skilled jobs in a decade. To achieve that, the policy envisaged establishment of greenfield integrated manufacturing cities; NIMZ-National Investment and Manufacturing Zones. Sixteen NIMZ were notified.

As Minister responsible for National Investment Policy, he piloted the opening of many sectors for FDI including Defence, and Civil Aviation. India allowed 100% FDI in Single Brand retail and opened up Multi Brand retail to Foreign Investors. The e-Biz Project was conceptualised and rolled out to improve business and investment climate.

Post Global Economic Crisis, India emerged as an alternative destination for Foreign Investors and during Anand Sharma's five years tenure received 190 bn USD as FDI.

He gave a forward looking Foreign Trade Policy ensuring its stability and predictability. It yielded positive dividend and India's merchandise exports almost doubled during 2010–2014.

Anand Sharma is credited with playing a critical leadership note at the IXth WTO Ministerial Meeting in Bali in December, 2013 and its successful outcome defending the right of India and the developing countries, to public stock holding of food grain for Food Security; he remained steadfast in negotiating a solution to end the impasse. Bali Ministerial, resulted in the first ever agreement. Since the establishment of the WTO including the Trade Facilitation Agreement (TFA).

He was also actively associated in negotiation and build a global consensus for historic Indo-US Nuclear Cooperation Agreement 2008 which ended decades of India's isolation and integration with the global mainstream for nuclear research and cooperation.

He made a notable contribution in the successful convening of an International Conference in Delhi in November, 2014, to commemorate the 125th Birth Anniversary of Jawaharlal Nehru- Independent India's first Prime Minister and an acknowledged World Statesman. Anand Sharma edited the historic Commemorative book " Remembering Jawaharlal Nehru", which has been universally acclaimed.

MP Rajya Sabha

Parliamentary Committees 
Since 2020, he is the chair person of the Parliamentary Standing Committee on Home Affairs.

Positions held 
 1984–86 Member, Committee on Petitions, Rajya Sabha from Himachal Pradesh
 1985–88 Member, Joint Parliamentary Committee on Lok Pal Bill
 1986–89 Nominated to the Panel of Vice-Chairmen, Rajya Sabha
 1987–88 Member, Consultative Committee for the Ministry of Defence (India)
 1988–90 Member, Committee on Government Assurances Member, Press Council of India
 April 2004 Elected to Rajya Sabha from Himachal Pradesh
 Aug. 2004 – Jan. 2006 Member, Parliamentary Standing Committee on Defence; 
 Aug. 2004 – Jan. 2006 Member, Consultative Committee for the Ministry of External Affairs; 
 Aug. 2004 – Jan. 2006 Member, Joint Committee on Salaries and Allowances of Members of Parliament
 Aug. 2004 – July 2006 Member, Business Advisory Committee
 Oct. 2004 – Jan. 2006 Ministry of External Affairs (India)
 29 Jan. 2006 – 22 May 2009 Minister of State in the Ministry of External Affairs
 22 May 2009 – 20 May 2014 Minister of Commerce and Industry
 July 2010 Re-elected to Rajya Sabha from Rajasthan, resigned 7 March 2016
 12 July 2011 – Minister of Textiles (Additional Charge)
 14 Mar 2016 Re-elected to Rajya Sabha from Himachal Pradesh
 Sept. 2016 - Aug. 2017 Chairman, Personnel, Public Grievances, Law & Justice
 1 Sept. 2017 - 25 May 2019 Chairman, Science & Technology, Environment and Forests
 13 Sept. 2019 - Till date Chairman, Standing Committee on Home Affairs

Personal life 
Anand Sharma married Dr. Zenobia on 23 February 1987. They have two sons. He is associated with a number of social and sports organizations and also an all India NGO in disability sector.

Awards

Foreign honours
:
 Companion of the Order of the Volta (10 November 2008)
:
 Commander of the National Order of the Ivory Coast (14 January 2009)
:
Special Award for contribution in strengthening India-South Africa relations on the occasion of 150 Years of the First Arrival of Indians in South Africa.

Publications 

 India's Indira, 2018
 Remembering Jawaharlal Nehru, 2016
 Journey of a Nation, 2011
 Gandhian Way, 2007

References

External links 

 Rajya Sabha – Profile
 Department of Commerce biography

Indian National Congress politicians
Himachal Pradesh University alumni
Union ministers of state of India
Indian Youth Congress Presidents
Members of the Cabinet of India
Rajya Sabha members from Rajasthan
1953 births
Living people
People from Shimla
Rajya Sabha members from Himachal Pradesh
Commerce and Industry Ministers of India